Anne Appleby (born 1954) is an American color field and landscape reductive painter, who lives and works in Jefferson City, Montana.

Education and background
Anne Appleby was born in 1954 in Harrisburg, Pennsylvania. She received her Bachelor of Fine Arts in 1977 from the University of Montana and her Master of Fine Arts in 1989 from the San Francisco Art Institute. Before attending the Art Institute, Appleby spent a fifteen-year apprenticeship with an Ojibwe Indian elder in Montana. From him, she learned her patient observation of nature. Appleby lives in Jefferson City, Montana.

Career
Appleby's works were described by the ArtZone 461 Gallery as "simple arrangements of colored canvas panels", with titles that take inspiration from "the natural world". Although panels may initially appear monochromatic, they are actually "deep and luminous gradations of hue." Appleby's work is often shown with that of "reductive" painters, but it does not exactly fit into the "pure" painting philosophy held by many of them. In 2004, Kenneth Baker wrote that "using no forms except monochrome panels, Appleby must struggle often with the potential problem of repetition. But [she] achieves a freshness and distinctness that persuade a viewer that she means each one. It is as if she has learned to translate the energy of intent directly into radiance of color."

Exhibitions and awards
She has participated in group exhibitions in institutions such as the Tacoma Art Museum in Washington, the American Academy in Rome, and the San Francisco Museum of Modern Art, where in 1996 she was awarded the SFMoMA SECA Art Award. She was also the 1999 recipient of the Biennial Award from the Louis Comfort Tiffany Foundation in New York. Appleby shows her paintings at San Francisco’s Anglim Gilbert Gallery, Franklin Parrasch Gallery in New York and Parrach Hiejenen in LA.

Solo exhibitions 
Anne Appleby has had various solo exhibitions.

 Diego Rivera Gallery, San Francisco Art Institute (1989)
 M.F.A. Exhibition, Fort Mason Center (1989)
 The Dancing Ground, installation, Mincher/Wilcox Gallery, San Francisco, California (1990)
 The Blue List, installation, Point Reyes Station, California (1990)
 Gallery Paule Anglim, San Francisco, California (1993)
 Littlejohn Contemporary, New York, New York (1996)
 Greg Kucera Gallery, Seattle, Washington (1998)
 Holter Museum of Art, Helena, Montana (1998)
 Yellowstone Art Museum, Billings, Montana (1999)
 Anne Appleby and Wes Mills, Richard Levy Gallery, Albuquerque, New Mexico (2000)
 Nora Eccles Harrison Museum of Art, Utah State University, Logan, UT (2000)
 Verona Suite, Crown Point Press, San Francisco (2000)
 Boise Art Museum, Idaho (2000)
 Anne Appleby and Wes Mills, Missoula Art Museum, Montana (2000)
 Sassuolo Ducal Palace, Camera di Fetonte, Sassulo, Italy (2001)

 University of Washington, Seattle (2002)
 Galerie Susanne Albrecht, Munich, Germany (2006)
 Villa e Collezione Panza, Varese, Italy (2007)
 Galerie Albrecht, Berlin, Germany (2008)
 Schmidt Contemporary, St. Louis, Missouri (2009)
 Museum Ritter, Waldenbuch, Germany (2010)
 The Mayor Gallery, London, England (2010)
 Ulrich Museum of Contemporary Art, Wichita, Kansas (2011)
 Danese, New York, New York (2012)
 Portland Art Museum Contemporary Northwest Artists Awards, Portland, Oregon (2013)
 Glaisteo River Basin Paintings, Charlotte Jackson Fine Art, Santa Fe, NM (2015)
 Montana Spring, Borzo Gallery, Amsterdam, Netherlands (2016)
 Nascent, Anglim Gilbert Gallery, San Francisco, CA (2016)
 But That Was Then, PDX Contemporary Art, Portland, OR (2016)
 We Sit Together the Mountain and Me, Tacoma Art Museum, WA (2018)
 Anglim Gilbert Gallery (2018)
 Here We Are, Helen E. Copeland Gallery, Montana State  University, Bozeman, MT (2019)
 Anne Appleby: Hymn: First Light, Franklin Parrasch Gallery (2019)

Selected collections 
Appleby's works are held in various museum collections.

 The National Gallery of Art
 Art Institute of Chicago
 Portland Art Museum
 Crocker Art Museum
 Denver Art Museum
 Berkeley Art Museum
 Missoula Art Museum
 Henry Art Gallery, University of Washington
 Seattle Art Museum
 San Francisco Museum of Modern Art
 San Jose Museum of Art

 Tacoma Art Museum
 Yellowstone Art Museum
 Boise Art Museum
 Albright-Knox Museum
 The Panza Collection, Lugano, Switzerland
 Museum of Modern and Contemporary Art of Trento and Rovereto
 Daimler Art Collection, Stuttgart/Berlin, Germany
 Ulrich Museum, Wichita State University

References

External links
 
 Appleby at the Anglim Gilbert Gallery
 View Anne Appleby's prints at Crown Point Press
 Anne Appleby at Eli Ridgway | Contemporary Art
 Anne Appleby at Franklin Parrasch

1954 births
Living people
American women painters
American women printmakers
Artists from Montana
People from Jefferson County, Montana
Painters from California
20th-century American painters
21st-century American painters
20th-century American women artists
21st-century American women artists
20th-century American printmakers